Kayla Bashore-Smedley (born February 20, 1983 in Daegu, South Korea) is an American field hockey defender and midfielder. Now living in  Bloomington, Indiana , she was a student of the Indiana University, where she played for the Hoosiers, and was the first player from that university to make the US National Field Hockey team. She represented the USA at the 2008 Summer Olympics.

Background
Bashore-Smedley grew up in a small town in Pennsylvania, and found her sporting love initially while playing soccer, rather than field hockey. After picking up her first field hockey stick as a high school student, she was recruited by that school's field hockey coach, and soon excelled at her new sport. A graduate of Hamburg Area High School, she went on to study at Indiana University, and played for that institution's team for four years. Still a senior there when she was asked to join the United States National Field Hockey Team, she went through rigorous training with her teammates at their training facility in San Diego, California. When her team qualified for the 2008 Olympics in Beijing, China, Bashore-Smedley participated, and was supported by her family, who also made the trip overseas. Although her team did not win any medals that year, they did beat their biggest rival (Argentina) during the 2012 Olympics in London, United Kingdom. Following more than 100 international appearances, Bashore-Smedley then retired in 2013.

International senior competitions
 2006 – World Cup Qualifier, Rome (4th)
 2006 – World Cup, Madrid (6th)
 2007 – Pan American Games, Rio de Janeiro (2nd)
 2008 – Summer Olympics (8th)

References

External links
 

1983 births
American female field hockey players
Field hockey players at the 2007 Pan American Games
Field hockey players at the 2008 Summer Olympics
Field hockey players at the 2012 Summer Olympics
Indiana Hoosiers field hockey players
Living people
Olympic field hockey players of the United States
People from Berks County, Pennsylvania
Sportspeople from Daegu
Field hockey players at the 2011 Pan American Games
Pan American Games gold medalists for the United States
Pan American Games medalists in field hockey
Medalists at the 2011 Pan American Games